The Europe/Africa Zone was one of three zones of regional competition in the 2007 Fed Cup.

Group I
Venue: TC Lokomotiv, Plovdiv, Bulgaria (outdoor clay) 
Date: 18–21 April

The sixteen teams were divided into four pools of four. The top teams of each pool played-off against each other to determine which two nations progress to World Group II Play-offs. The four nations coming last played-off against each other to decide which teams are relegated to Group II for 2008.

Pools

Play-offs

  and  advanced to the 2007 World Group II Play-offs.

Group II
Venue: National Tennis Centre, Vacoas-Phoenix, Mauritius (outdoor hard) 
Date: 17–20 April

The seven teams were divided into one pool of three teams and one pool of four. The top two teams of each pool played-off against each other to decide which two nations progress to Group I for 2008. The four nations coming third in each pool then played-off to determine which team would join the fourth-placed team from the four-team pool in being relegated down to Group III for 2008.

Pools

Play-offs

  and  advanced to the 2007 World Group II Play-offs.

Group III
Venue: National Tennis Centre, Vacoas-Phoenix, Mauritius (outdoor hard) 
Date: 23–27 April

The ten teams were divided into two pools of five. The top team of each pool progressed to Group II for 2008.

Pools

  and  advanced to Group II for 2009.

See also
Fed Cup structure

References

 Fed Cup Profile, Romania
 Fed Cup Profile, Switzerland
 Fed Cup Profile, Netherlands
 Fed Cup Profile, Ukraine
 Fed Cup Profile, Belarus
 Fed Cup Profile, Lithuania
 Fed Cup Profile, Serbia
 Fed Cup Profile, Sweden
 Fed Cup Profile, Estonia
 Fed Cup Profile, Luxembourg
 Fed Cup Profile, Great Britain
 Fed Cup Profile, Bulgaria
 Fed Cup Profile, South Africa
 Fed Cup Profile, Greece
 Fed Cup Profile, Georgia
 Fed Cup Profile, Bosnia and Herzegovina
 Fed Cup Profile, Norway
 Fed Cup Profile, Turkey
 Fed Cup Profile, Liechtenstein
 Fed Cup Profile, Ireland
 Fed Cup Profile, Montenegro
 Fed Cup Profile, Malta
 Fed Cup Profile, Moldova
 Fed Cup Profile, Denmark

External links
 Fed Cup website

 
Europe Africa
Sport in Plovdiv
Tennis tournaments in Bulgaria
Sport in Vacoas-Phoenix
Tennis tournaments in Mauritius
2007 in Bulgarian tennis